Madidi is a river located in the La Paz Department of Bolivia. It is tributary of the Beni River and a part of the Amazon Basin. It runs through the Madidi National Park.

References

Rivers of La Paz Department (Bolivia)